Waves of Dreams is an album by American saxophonist Sonny Fortune recorded in 1976 and released on the Horizon label.

Reception
The Allmusic review by Scott Yanow awarded the album 2 stars stating "Considering his talent, this was a rather weak and overly commercial effort by the great altoist Sonny Fortune".

Track listing
All compositions by Sonny Fortune except as indicated
 "Seeing Beyond the Obvious" - 6:17    
 "A Space in Time" - 7:17    
 "In Waves of Dreams" - 6:48    
 "Revelation" (Michael Cochrane) - 9:41    
 "Thoughts" - 10:19

Personnel
Sonny Fortune - alto saxophone, soprano saxophone, flute, tambourine, synthesizer, shaker, percussion
Charles Sullivan - trumpet, flugelhorn (tracks 1 & 3-5)
Michael Cochrane - piano, electric piano 
Clifford Coulter - synthesizer (tracks 3 & 5)
Buster Williams - bass
Chip Lyle - drums
Angel Allende - congas, percussion (tracks 1 & 3-5)

References

Horizon Records albums
Sonny Fortune albums
1976 albums